Stephen A. Rotter is a film editor who won at the 56th Academy Awards in the category of Best Film Editing. He was one of the five film editors to win for the film The Right Stuff. He shared it with Glenn Farr, Lisa Fruchtman, Tom Rolf and Douglas Stewart.

He has worked on over 30 films as an editor.

In addition, Rotter has also won an Emmy for the mini-series Holocaust. Which he shared with Alan Heim, Craig McKay, Robert M. Reitano and Brian Smedley-Aston.

Selected filmography

 Alice's Restaurant (1969) (assistant editor)
 Little Big Man (1970) (assistant editor)
 Slaughterhouse-Five (1972) (assistant film editor)
 Visions of Eight (1973) (assistant editor)
 The Seven-Ups (1973)
 Night Moves (1975)
 The Missouri Breaks (1976)
 Johnny, We Hardly Knew Ye (1977)
 The Deadliest Season (1977)
 Holocaust (1978)
 Siege (1978)
 Skokie (1981)
 The World According to Garp (1982)
 The Right Stuff (1983)
 Heaven Help Us (1985)
 Target (1985)
 Ishtar (1987)
 Dirty Rotten Scoundrels (1988)
 An Innocent Man (1989)
 My Blue Heaven (1990)
 True Colors (1991)
 Prelude to a Kiss (1992)
 Rising Sun (1993)
 Cops & Robbersons (1994)
 Baby's Day Out (1994) (additional editor)
 Father of the Bride Part II (1995)
 The Preacher's Wife (1996)
 Flubber (1997) (additional editor)
 The Parent Trap (1998)
 Down to You (2000)
 What Women Want (2000)
 America's Sweethearts (2001)
 Head of State (2003)
 Something's Gotta Give (2003) (additional film editor)
 Yours, Mine & Ours (2005)
 The Ex (2006) (additional editor)
 Enchanted (2007)
 Nim's Island (2008) (additional film editor)
 A Little Bit of Heaven (2011)

References

External links
 

Film editors
Living people
Best Film Editing Academy Award winners
Year of birth missing (living people)
Primetime Emmy Award winners